Ouhoumoudou Mahamadou's government has governed Niger since 9 April 2021.

Ministers 
The government, chaired by Prime Minister Ouhoumoudou Mahamadou, has 33 Ministries which are:

 Ministry of Foreign Affairs and Cooperation: Hassoumi Massoudou
 Minister of State to the Presidency of the Republic: Rhissa Ag Boula
 Ministry of National Defence: Alkassoum Indattou
 Ministry of Interior and Decentralization: Alkache Alhada
 Ministry of Vocational Training: Kassoum Mamane Moctar
 Ministry of Higher Education and Research: Mamoudou Djibo
 Ministry of Public Health, Population and Social Affairs: Illiassou Idi Mainassara
 Ministry of Mines: Ousseini Hadizatou Yacouba
 Ministry of Post and New Information Technologies: Hassane Barazé Moussa
 Ministry of Transport: Oumarou Malam Alma
 Ministry of Humanitarian Action and Disaster Management: Laouan Magagi
 Ministry of Livestock and government spokesperson: Tidjani Idrissa Abdoulkadri
 Ministry of Equipment: Hamadou Adamou Souley
 Ministry of Justice and Keeper of the Seals: Boubakar Hassan
 Ministry of Communication, responsible for Relations with institutions: Zada ​​Mahamadou
 Ministry of Finance: Ahmat Jidoud
 Ministry of Trade, Industry and Youth Entrepreneurship: Gado Sabo Moctar
 Ministry of Agriculture: Alambedji Abba Issa
 Ministry of Urban Planning, Housing and Sanitation: Maïzoumbou Laoual Amadou
 Ministry of Planning: Abdou Rabiou
 Ministry of Petroleum, Energy and Renewable Energies: Sani Issoufou Mahamadou
 Ministry of Culture, Tourism and Handicrafts: Mohamed Hamid
 Ministry of Territorial Planning and Community Development: Maman Ibrahim Mahaman
 Ministry for the Promotion of Women and the Protection of Children: Allahoury Aminata Zourkaleini
 Ministry of National Education: Rabiou Ousman
 Ministry of Hydraulics: Adamou Mahaman
 Ministry of Public Service and Labor: Ataka Zaharatou Aboubacar
 Ministry of the Environment and the Fight against Desertification: Garama Saratou Rabiou Inoussa
 Ministry of Employment and Social Protection: Ibrahim Boukary
 Ministry of Youth and Sport: Sekou Doro Adamou
 Ministry Delegate to the Ministry of Finance, in charge of the Budget: Gourouza Magagi Salmou
 Minister Delegate to the Ministry of the Interior and Decentralization, in charge of Decentralization: Dardaou Zaneidou
 Minister Delegate to the Ministry of State for Foreign Affairs and Cooperation, in charge of African Integration: Youssouf Mohamed Almouctar

References

See also 

 Cabinet of Niger

Current governments
Government of Niger
2022 establishments in Niger
Cabinets established in 2022